Jon Dahl Tomasson (born 29 August 1976) is a Danish football manager and former player who is the current head coach of EFL Championship club Blackburn Rovers.

A forward, his most notable run of football came in his first stint at Feyenoord, with whom he won the 2002 UEFA Cup, and Italian club AC Milan, with whom he won the UEFA Champions League in 2003 and reached the final in 2005. He also played top-flight football in England, Germany and Spain. He is the joint all-time top goalscorer for the Denmark national team with 52 goals in 112 games and was also honoured with the Danish Player of the Year award in both 2002 and 2004. He played at the UEFA European Championship in 2000 and 2004 and the FIFA World Cup in 2002 and 2010.

After his playing career, Tomasson went into coaching, being both assistant and manager in the Netherlands, before becoming assistant manager in the Denmark national team under Åge Hareide. In 2020, Tomasson became the manager of Malmö FF and left two years later after winning the Swedish championship for two consecutive seasons. In June 2022, he signed a three-year deal at Blackburn Rovers.

Club career

Early career
Born in Copenhagen, son of Bjarne Tomasson and Leila Dahl Petersen, Tomasson first started playing football as a five-year-old in the youth team of Solrød BK near Køge. At nine years of age, he moved to the biggest club in the area, Køge BK. In November 1992, at 16, he made his senior debut for the club. During the next two years he helped the club to get promoted twice in a row: at the end of the 1993 season, when the club was promoted from the Denmark Series to the 2nd Division; and at the end of the 1994 season, when the club was promoted to the 1st Division.

Heerenveen
In December 1994, aged 18, he agreed on a transfer from Køge BK to the Dutch club SC Heerenveen, of the Eredivisie. A first-team regular by the 1995–96 season, Tomasson was the club top scorer for the season as well, netting 14 goals in 30 league matches. He increased this tally in the 1996–97 season to 18, and was top-scorer for the club once again. On top of that, he also won the Best Dutch Football Talent of 1996, beating the likes of Boudewijn Zenden and Patrick Kluivert to the prize.

Newcastle United
His success attracted the interest of other clubs, and he completed a high-profile move to FA Premier League club Newcastle United in July 1997. Newcastle's manager at the time, Kenny Dalglish, saw Tomasson as the perfect link-up player to England national team striker Alan Shearer. The partnership initially worked well, with Tomasson impressing during a pre-season friendly tournament in the Republic of Ireland. However, a career threatening injury to Shearer, combined with the transfer of striker Les Ferdinand to Tottenham Hotspur, meant that Tomasson was moved from his traditional attacking midfield position to that of striker. He struggled to adapt to his new position on the field, and to the English game, due to his lack of physical strength. He scored only four goals in 35 appearances in all competitions during the 1997–98 season.

Feyenoord
Tomasson returned to the Eredivisie in July 1998, where he joined Feyenoord, once again as an attacking midfielder. The club won the Eredivisie championship for the 1998–99 season, and the Dutch Super Cup. Although Feyenoord did not manage to repeat as champions in the following years, they still performed well enough to capture third place in 1999–00, second place in 2000–01, and third place again in 2001–02. In his latter two seasons, Tomasson scored 15 and 17 Eredivisie goals respectively, forming a partnership with Pierre van Hooijdonk, who was 2002's league top scorer with 24 goals.

In 2002, Tomasson was an integral player in the Feyenoord team, that won its first international trophy in 26 years, when the club triumphed in the 2001–02 UEFA Cup tournament. He scored four goals in the tournament and also had an impressive collaboration on the field with striker Pierre van Hooijdonk. During the tournament, they defeated SC Freiburg, Rangers F.C., PSV Eindhoven and Internazionale Milano before meeting German team Borussia Dortmund in the final. Tomasson scored the goal to 3–1, in a game that ended 3–2 to Feyenoord, and he was subsequently voted man of the match.

Milan
On 2 May 2002, as Tomasson's contract with Feyenoord was expiring before their UEFA Cup victory, he agreed a move to Italy on a four-year free transfer, to play for Serie A club A.C. Milan. He joined compatriots Martin Laursen and Thomas Helveg at the San Siro club.

The 2002–03 season, Tomasson's first at Milan, saw them winning the Italian Cup. Tomasson was most often used as a late substitute, but did manage to score three goals in the UEFA Champions League; and thereby also held his share of the trophy, when Milan won the prestigious tournament in May 2003. Tomasson missed the final because of an injury that he picked up in the first leg of the 2003 Coppa Italia Final. During the 2003–04 season, Tomasson was given more playing time and managed to score 12 Serie A goals in a title-winning campaign. In August 2004, he was also a part of the Milan team that won the Italian Super Cup, with a 3–0 victory against the Coppa Italia champions Lazio.

For the next 2004–05 season, he struggled to secure a regular starting place in the line-up of Milan. He was once again in the role of substitute, and therefore also scored fewer goals compared to the previous season. At the 2005 UEFA Champions League Final against Liverpool, he was again used by Milan as a late substitute, and when the final had to be decided in penalty shootout, he was selected to kick. Tomasson scored on his attempt, but Milan lost as Serginho, Andrea Pirlo and Andriy Shevchenko missed their shots. When striker Christian Vieri joined the club in July 2005, Tomasson was deemed as potential surplus, and he therefore agreed with Milan to be placed at their transfer list.

Years later, prior to the 2010–11 UEFA Champions League round of 16 match between Chelsea FC and FC Copenhagen former Milan manager Carlo Ancelotti, now manager of Chelsea, was asked about his view on Danish footballers: "Above all the Danish work ethic surprised me, their special ability to give everything in training. These were very professional and skilled players. The one who performed best and showed the most continuity, was Jon Dahl Tomasson, who always had to fight for playing time against world class strikers. He never had an easy time, but he never gave up and tried to take every chance he got".

VfB Stuttgart
In July 2005, the German Bundesliga club VfB Stuttgart paid a transfer fee to Milan of €7.5 million, in order to sign Tomasson to a four-year contract. He joined international teammate Jesper Grønkjær at the club but the upcoming 2005–06 season was not successful for either of them. Even though Tomasson was the team's top scorer with eight Bundesliga goals, the team struggled throughout the season to create enough chances and goals, and as a consequence Stuttgart only finished in ninth position of the Bundesliga. After the season, Grønkjær left the club, while Tomasson stayed and in the 2006–07 season Stuttgart became the new champions of the Bundesliga.

Villarreal
On 24 January 2007, Tomasson was loaned to Villarreal in the Spanish Primera División championship, to cover the place of the injured striker Nihat Kahveci, for the remaining part of the 2006–07 season. When he made his Villarreal debut, in a game against Real Madrid, Tomasson became only the fifth player to have played in the Premier League, Serie A, Bundesliga and Primera División. This rare achievement had previously only been made by the four players: Florin Răducioiu, Gheorghe Popescu, Abel Xavier and Pierre Womé.

His loan contract expired on 1 July 2007, but also featured a buying option, for which Villarreal paid Stuttgart the second half of a total transfer fee at €1 million in order to sign Tomasson to a two-year contract . In the first match of the 2007–08 La Liga season, he scored in a 3–0 victory against Valencia, but he mostly played the club's UEFA Cup games that season, and scored five goals in eight games. The season ended as the best ever for Villarreal, who were runners-up in La Liga.

Return to Feyenoord
Tomasson agreed with Villarreal in June 2008 to search the market for a possible transfer. The Spanish sportspaper Marca immediately linked him together with Dutch side Feyenoord. This was at first described by Tomasson as pure speculation. The speculation, however, turned out to be true. In July 2008, he left Villarreal on a free transfer, and returned to Feyenoord on a new three-year contract. He made a fine start with four goals in three games. But this was followed by an injury from the end of September until the end of January, which meant he could only play a total of 14 games for Feyenoord in 2008–09.

In the next 2009–10 season, he again had to battle with a couple of injuries. But during the season he was still able to play another 28 games for Feyenoord, where he scored a club-best 12 goals. With his good performance on the field, he helped Feyenoord to achieve a fourth place in the Eredivisie, and help the club to reach the final of the Dutch Cup. The final was played over two legs, and Feyenoord lost 6–1 on aggregate to Ajax, with Tomasson scoring the only goal for Feyenoord. During the 2010 World Cup, he was hit by another serious injury, that spoiled his first half of the 2010–11 season for Feyenoord. According to the medical staff at Feyenoord, the injury was a lot worse than original thought. When they tried to get him ready for a game at 15 August, the injury had not entirely healed; and after a too hard training session, it therefore reappeared at its previous strength. Based upon further examination of the injury, the coach now feared that Tomasson only would be ready to play his first game of the season in January 2011.

International career
Tomasson  scored 10 goals in 16 games for the national under-19 team, and was awarded 1994 Danish U-19 Player of the Year. In all, he scored 27 goals in 37 matches for various national youth selections.

After two good seasons with Heerenveen, Tomasson got a call-up to the Denmark national team, and he made his debut on 29 March 1997, against Croatia. During his time at Newcastle, reduced playing time saw Tomasson dropped by the Denmark national team, and he was not selected to play at the 1998 FIFA World Cup. When he moved to Feyenoord, Tomasson was once more called up for the Denmark national team in August 1998, and with six goals in seven matches of the Euro 2000 qualification, he quickly became an important part of the Danish team, playing as an attacking midfielder behind striker Ebbe Sand. He played in all Denmark's three matches at the main Euro 2000 tournament, but did not score as Denmark were eliminated in the group stage. Before moving to Milan, he played for Denmark in the 2002 FIFA World Cup, where he scored four goals in as many games. 

Tomasson played for Denmark at Euro 2004, where he scored three goals in four games and was selected for the Euro 2004 Team of the Tournament. On 28 May 2010, Denmark coach Morten Olsen announced that the player would be part of the final squad of 23 participating in the 2010 FIFA World Cup in South Africa. On 24 June, he scored against Japan in a 3–1 defeat as Denmark went out of the competition. He was rated by FIFA as the best Danish player of the tournament. Some fans and the media did not agree with the world football's governing body, however.

Tomasson scored a total of 52 goals in 112 games for Denmark throughout his career, which spanned from March 1997 to June 2010, making him joint all time goal scorer of the Denmark national team with Poul Nielsen. He played at Euro 2000, the 2002 World Cup, Euro 2004 and the 2010 World Cup. On 9 August 2010, having scored 52nd international goal in Denmark's final match at the 2010 World Cup, Tomasson decided to retire from the national team. "We say farewell to a terrific player and a fantastic person," national coach Olsen said, adding that Tomasson was "the ultimate team player".

Coaching career

Early coaching career

Tomasson retired on 6 June 2011, and became assistant coach at Dutch club Excelsior. He became the club's head coach at the beginning of the 2013–14 season. His debut was a 2–2 Eerste Divisie draw at home to Helmond Sport, and he took the Rotterdam-based team to the last 16 of the KNVB Cup before losing 2–1 at home to PEC Zwolle on 17 December.

Eredivisie side Roda JC Kerkrade sacked their head coach Ruud Brood on 15 December 2013, and signed Tomasson 11 days later, on a 3-year deal, effective 3 January. He made his debut 15 days later in a 2–2 draw at his former club Heerenveen. After the second half of the season, which resulted in relegation, he was dismissed on 26 May 2014.

On 19 June 2015, Tomasson was appointed as the new assistant manager of Vitesse. On 7 March 2016, he was appointed as an assistant coach of the Danish national team. During their 3.5 year working they duo qualified the Danish national team for the 2018 FIFA World Cup and the 2020 UEFA European Championship. The team did not loose a game for 3 years.

Malmö FF
On 5 January 2020, Tomasson was appointed as the new manager of Swedish Allsvenskan side Malmö FF. He led the team to the 2020 Allsvenskan title in his first season with the club, winning Malmö FF its 21st Swedish Championship.

In his second season for Malmö FF he took the club to the group stage of Champions League after succeeding in four qualification rounds, including beating Rangers in the third round and Ludogorets Razgrad in the fourth. In December 2021, Tomasson and Malmō FF won their second consecutive Allsvenskan league title. On 30 December, he left by his own request.

Blackburn Rovers
On 14 June 2022, Tomasson was appointed as the new head coach of Blackburn Rovers. He signed a three-year deal at the club, stating: "I'm really proud and excited to be taking over as head coach of Blackburn Rovers – a club with a lot of tradition and also great ambition." On his debut on 30 July, the team won 1–0 at home to Queens Park Rangers with a long-range goal from Lewis Travis.

Personal life 
Tomasson has two sons, Luca (born in 2008) and Liam (born in 2012), with his Danish wife Line Dahl Kongeskov Tomasson.
Tomasson is of Danish, Finnish and Icelandic heritage.

Style of play
Tomasson was known for his positional strength and fine finishing as a forward, despite his lack of notable pace or physicality. He also drew praise from pundits and managers for his discipline in training, and for his work-rate and movement off the ball, as well as his ability to create space for his teammates with his runs. A versatile player, he was capable of playing both as a striker and as a second striker.

Career statistics

Club

International

Scores and results list Denmark's goal tally first, score column indicates score after each Tomasson goal.

 (a): Match abandoned

Managerial record

Honours

Player 
Feyenoord
 Eredivisie: 1998–99
 Johan Cruijff Shield: 1999
 UEFA Cup: 2001–02

A.C. Milan
 Serie A: 2003–04
 Coppa Italia: 2002–03
 Supercoppa Italiana: 2004
 UEFA Champions League: 2002–03
 UEFA Super Cup: 2003

Individual
 1994 Danish U19 Player of the Year
 1996 Dutch Football Talent of the Year
 2002 World Cup Bronze shoe (4 goals)
 2002 Danish Player of the Year
 2004 UEFA Euro All-Star Team
 2004 Danish Player of the Year
 1994 top-scorer of the Danish 2nd Division (23 goals) and Køge BK (27 goals)
 1995–96 top-scorer of SC Heerenveen (14 goals)
 1996–97 top-scorer of SC Heerenveen (24 goals)
 2000–01 top-scorer of Feyenoord (17 goals)
 2005–06 top-scorer of VfB Stuttgart (11 goals)
 2009–10 top-scorer of Feyenoord (12 goals)

Manager
Malmö FF
 Allsvenskan: 2020, 2021
 Allsvenskan Manager of the Year: 2020

See also 

 List of top international men's football goalscorers by country
 List of men's footballers with 100 or more international caps
 List of men's footballers with 50 or more international goals

References

External links

 
 
 

1976 births
Living people
Footballers from Copenhagen
Danish men's footballers
Denmark youth international footballers
Denmark under-21 international footballers
Denmark international footballers
Association football forwards
Danish people of Icelandic descent
Danish people of Finnish descent
Køge Boldklub players
SC Heerenveen players
Newcastle United F.C. players
Feyenoord players
A.C. Milan players
Villarreal CF players
VfB Stuttgart players
UEFA Cup winning players
Eredivisie players
Premier League players
Serie A players
La Liga players
Bundesliga players
UEFA Euro 2000 players
2002 FIFA World Cup players
UEFA Euro 2004 players
Danish expatriate men's footballers
Danish expatriate sportspeople in the Netherlands
Expatriate footballers in the Netherlands
Expatriate footballers in England
Danish expatriate sportspeople in Italy
Expatriate footballers in Italy
Danish expatriate sportspeople in Spain
Danish expatriate sportspeople in Germany
Danish expatriate sportspeople in England
Danish expatriate sportspeople in Sweden
Expatriate footballers in Spain
Expatriate footballers in Germany
Danish Superliga players
FIFA Century Club
2010 FIFA World Cup players
UEFA Champions League winning players
Danish football managers
Danish expatriate football managers
Expatriate football managers in the Netherlands
Expatriate football managers in Sweden
Expatriate football managers in England
Excelsior Rotterdam managers
Roda JC Kerkrade managers
Malmö FF managers
Blackburn Rovers F.C. managers
Eerste Divisie managers
Eredivisie managers
English Football League managers